The Sinfonia Concertante for Four Winds in E-flat major, K. 297b (Anh. C 14.01), is a work thought to be by Wolfgang Amadeus Mozart for oboe, clarinet, horn, bassoon, and orchestra. He originally wrote a work for flute, oboe, horn, bassoon, and orchestra, K. Anh. 9 (297B), in Paris in April 1778. This original work is lost.

The lost Mozart Sinfonia Concertante
In April 1778, Mozart wrote to his father from Paris about the sinfonia concertante he was writing for performance at the Concert Spirituel naming the four virtuoso soloists who were to play. They were Johan Wendling (flute),  Friedrich Ramm (Oboe), Giovanni Punto (horn) and Georg Wenzl Ritter (bassoon). Mozart knew the three woodwind players from a previous visit to Mannheim. He wrote that the four soloists were "in love with" the work and that Joseph Legros, the Concert Spirituel director, had kept the score to have it copied. However at the last minute Mozart's piece was displaced from the concert program by a piece for similar forces by Giuseppe Cambini and the Mozart work was never played. From this point the original Mozart work became lost.

The Sinfonia Concertante as it is played today
The work as it is performed today came to light in 1869 as an anonymous copy manuscript in the collection of Otto Jahn. Jahn wrote the first scholarly biography of W. A. Mozart and had amassed a large quantity of Mozart letters, original manuscripts and score copies.  These he made available to Köchel to assist with the creation of the Köchel catalogue of Mozart's work. There is considerable debate about the relation of this work as it is performed today to the lost original work, in part because the Jahn score has a somewhat different lineup of soloists from the lost Mozart work, but also because it contains errors both of copying and composition.

Instrumentation
The Sinfonia Concertante is scored for solo oboe, solo clarinet, solo horn, solo bassoon, and an orchestra of two horns, two oboes, and strings. A typical performance lasts about 28 minutes.

Movements
The work consists of three movements:
Allegro, in common time. This movement is in sonata form with three expositions rather than two – one played by the orchestra, the other two by the soloists. It contains a written cadenza before the coda.
Adagio in common time, with "gentle exchanges of thematic material".
Andante con variazioni, a theme with ten variations and a coda. Each variation is separated by "identical, basically decorative orchestral ritornelli". This movement is in 2/4 time until the end of the last variation, where 6 adagio bars in common time lead to a coda in 6/8 time.

Authenticity
Mozart is known through letters and concert announcements to have written a sinfonia concertante for flute, oboe, horn, and bassoon, the original score of which is lost. There is considerable debate about the authenticity of what is performed today, and whether the extant piece is even related to the original work. Various scholars have conflicting opinions, and some say the composition is currently in a corrupt form.
 
Initially the Sinfonia Concertante seems to have been accepted uncritically as a slightly different version of Mozart's lost work. However in the 1930s Donald Tovey described it as "blundering" and "inept". Alfred Einstein however considered it genuine. He considered the work to be an arrangement which retained the essential nature of the original and he identified a recurring mozartean "motto" in the slow movement. Stanley Sadie was dismissive in particular noting that the solo clarinet cannot be directly back-transcribed to a supposed oboe part. Martin Staehelin considered that it was inconceivable that Mozart wrote a homotonal concerto (i.e. with all three movements in the same key; here E-flat major). No other attested Mozart concerto is homotonal though several of his symphonies and divertimenti are. Sadie thought that a sufficient reason for the homotonal character of the work might be to avoid a natural horn crook change and retune between movements. Staehelin has written a book about the work which argues that it cannot be by Mozart. The Mozart Project considers this piece as "spurious or doubtful", and it does not appear on the project's listing of concertos.

Robert Levin analysed the Sinfonia Concertante and compared the structure of the work with known Mozart concertos. From this analysis he concluded that while the orchestral part and the first movement cadenza were spurious, the soloists' roles were based on the Mozart originals but had been modified by an unknown hand to substitute a clarinet for the oboe part and to change the flute for an oboe. This transcription process would have required the music for the three woodwind instruments to have been redistributed to accommodate the substitution of the clarinet for the original oboe part. Levin theorised that the unknown arranger had only the four original Mozart solo parts for reference so had composed the orchestral parts and cadenzas afresh. Levin wrote a book about the work and then went on to make a reconstruction of the supposed original Mozart work based on his research. Levin's reconstruction was recorded by the Academy of St Martin in the Fields  under Neville Marriner.

Mozart displayed affection and prominence for the wind instruments in his operas and concertos. Noteworthy wind passages are in the fifteenth and seventeenth piano concertos, with memorable dialogues with the soloist; flute, oboe and bassoon. In opera there are many arias with similar woodwind and French Horn passages, such as Fiordiligi's "Per pietà, ben mio, perdona" from Così fan tutte. The aria Se il padre perdei from Idomeneo uses the same four wind instruments as the lost Paris work, is in E-flat and was written for the same Mannheim soloists. A passage from the Mozart Oboe Quartet first movement (bars 85-87 and 88-90) appears to quote the Sinfonia Concertante. Both works were written for the same player Friedrich Ramm.

The Sinfonia Concertante remains popular today, and is regularly performed.

References

Sources

Further reading

External links

Concertos by Wolfgang Amadeus Mozart
Mozart
Mozart
1778 compositions
Compositions in E-flat major
Mozart: spurious and doubtful works